is a Japanese academic and media artist. He has a doctorate from the University of Tokyo. He is also an Associate Professor at the University of Tsukuba Library, as well as an Information and Media Associate Professor and Director of the Centre for Digital Nature Development and Research. Specially-appointed professor at Digital Hollywood University, visiting professor at Osaka University of Arts and Kyoto City University of Arts, Visiting Professor at Kanazawa College of Art. Director of the Information-technology Promotion Agency, MITOU Super Creator, MITOU PM and General Incorporated Association MITOU. Member of the Moonshot R&D System Visionary Council and Moonshot Ambassador, Cabinet Office. Principal investigator of the Japan Science and Technology Agency CREST xDiversity project, and producer of the Signature Project for the 2025 Japan International Expo (Expo Osaka-Kansai). Pixie Dust Technologies Ltd, President.

Main activity

As a media artist  
He has been working as a media artist since around 2010. As a media artist, he has several solo and group exhibitions per year, as well as an international communication of Japanese culture.

With the artist statement "Mononizing Computer: Confronting Nature and Ruminating on Longing and Emotion between Mass and Image", Ochiai's activities range from research to social implementation and are not limited to the expression of electronic technology. Ochiai states, "The vernacular, popular art and production process for local consumption, using something from the 'natural' environment to create a work of art, has not changed since ancient times, whether it is Japanese or Western painting" and considers media art as "Vernacular Art of Digital Nature".

As a researcher 
Engaged in research with a vision of digital nature, he has been running his own 'Digital Nature Laboratory' at the University of Tsukuba since 2015, and has also been the director of the "Digital Nature Development Research Centre" since 2020. He specialises in media arts as well as 'human computer interaction' and applied fields using 'intelligent technology' and 'audio-visual technology'. application areas. Ochiai says that his academic research activities, exploration of expression through media art and various social implementations have led to a new 'vision of nature' that he calls 'Digital Nature'.
His publications in the laboratory are in the fields of human-computer interaction, virtual reality, aerial displays and spatial graphics, in the field of research on collaboration and co-creation between artificial intelligence and human intelligence, and in the fields of accessibility and diversity. As a researcher, he has received the World Technology Award and the Laval Virtual Award from Laval Virtual, Europe's largest VR festival, five times in four consecutive years.
In education, he teaches lectures on media arts, media technology and content expression at both undergraduate and postgraduate levels at the University of Tsukuba. In addition to the University of Tsukuba, he has taught at Osaka University of Arts, Kanazawa College of Art, Kyoto City University of Arts and Digital Hollywood University.

Digital Nature 
Digital Nature is a new natural environment that is reconstructed through the affinity between computer and non-computer resources and is "a new nature where people, things, nature, computers and data are connected and de-structured" and a new vision of nature proposed by Yoichi Ochiai. Digital Nature's evolutionary speed continues to speed up day by day, and Ochiai states that we must continually renew our relationship with a new, ever-changing nature through digital means.
The permanent exhibition "DigitallyNatural, Naturally Digital" at National Museum of Emerging Science and Innovation, for which Ochiai served as art director and exhibition supervisor The exhibition states that "The world is now full of computers created by us, and the resolution and processing power of the world they create is exceeding the limits of our human perception and intelligence. In the near future, the difference between the original nature and the nature created by the computer world will diminish more and more, and a "new nature" will emerge for us in the future, in which we will not even be aware of the difference. Imagine a big nature in which nature inside and outside the computer is united, and think about how our view of nature and the world will change and what kind of 'questions' we will find".

Digital Nature Development and Research Centre 
As of 1 June 2020, the Digital Nature Development and Research Centre was established at the University of Tsukuba. The research centre aims to integrate computing and nature. In the release surrounding its establishment, it is stated that "The centre will study the co-creation environment of information media devices and people in such a feedback loop and promote a series of research related to 'digital nature', thereby deepening research on elemental technologies, etc. for social implementation, and through interdisciplinary collaboration with culture, art and sports. Through interdisciplinary collaboration with culture, art and sports, we will conduct research on the development of media devices and services that utilise them.

xDiversity 
JST CREST "Social Implementation of Spatial Viewing and Tactile Technology Based on Super AI Infrastructure for a Computational Diversity-enabled Society" xDiversity (cross-diversity) research representative , and as a general incorporated association xDiversity, working on projects to realise a diverse society that embraces the differences in human physical abilities. Projects such as automated wheelchairs, diversity-enabled entertainment (Concerts without Hearing by Ear) and walking with prosthetic legs (Otome Prosthetic Legs Project) and other projects aiming to adapt machine learning techniques to various bodily diversities.

Pixie Dust Technologies 
Digital transformation of space and social implementation of university-originated technologies Pixie Dust Technologies Ltd was founded for the purpose of. Through research and development of human interface technology and computer simulation technology, the company has developed tactile speaker technology and metamaterial technology, digital transformation of construction sites and social implementation of technology, including BCP solutions for corona protection.

Artworks

Solo Exhibitions 
Image and Matter (Dec. 2016 - Jan. 2017 / Kuala Lumpur, Malaysia)
Imago et Materia (Mar. - Apr. 2017 / Roppongi, Tokyo)
Japanese Technium Exhibition (Apr. - May. 2017 / Kioicho, Tokyo)
Yoichi Ochiai: Beauty of Natural Resolution End to End Transformation of Material Things Digital Nature (Apr. - Jun. 2018 / Omotesando, Tokyo)
Sehnsucht nach Masse 2019 (Jan. 24 - Feb. 6, 2019 / Higashi-Shinagawa, Tokyo)
Ruminating with the Spirituality 2019 (Sep. 5 - Oct. 12, 2019 / Tokyo, Ginza Leica Store)
Rinkou Suru Reisei (Oct. 5 - Oct. 27, 2019 / Tokyo, The Shop Yohji Yamamoto)
Reminiscence of the Unknown, Image and Matter || Digitally Natural, Naturally Digital || Sehnsucht nach Masse (Jul. 23 (Thu) - Aug. 31 (Sun), 2020 / Shibuya Modi, Tokyo)
Bukka: Transformation of Material Things (Feb. 5 - Feb. 28, 2021 / Experimental Gallery, Hong Kong Arts Centre, Hong Kong)
 Perspective of umwet Time and Space, Digital Nature and Arts (Apr. 28 - May. 30, 2021 / Kitakyushu Museum of Life and Travel) 
The transformation of material things into a living forest -Digital Nature- Exhibition in Daigoji Temple (Nov. 21 - Dec. 5, 2021 / Kyoto, Daigoji Temple)
 Special project for the 55th anniversary of the Kusakabe Mingeikan Kick-off event for Yoichi Ochiai's exhibition 'Media and Mingei - Nodal point seen in the post-corona'. (Dec. 13 - Dec. 26, 2021 /Gifu, Kusakabe Mingeikan)
 Re-Digitalisation of Waves (Jan. 28 - Feb. 13, 2022 / Osaka, Osaka Kansai International Art Festival]]) 
 Yoichi OCHIAI Ubiquitous Existence of Bodies, Interwoven Time and Space - Returning to the Ring, Carbon, Digital, Ideological and Narrative Forms - (Apr. 9 - May. 22, 2022 /Gifu, Kusakabe Mingeikan) 
 Nakedness and Materiality (Apr. 16 - May. 1, 2022 /Tokyo, Kitamura Photography Studio]) 
 "Null soku ze shiki shiki soku ze nuru" (Sep. 28 - Oct. 11, 2022 /Hankyu Men's Building, Tokyo).

References

1987 births
Living people